was a Japanese politician of the Liberal Democratic Party who was a member of the House of Councillors in the Diet (national legislature). A native of Gifu, Gifu, Japan, and graduate of the University of Tokyo, he joined the Ministry of International Trade and Industry in 1960, attending the University of London while in the ministry. Leaving the ministry in 1981, he was elected to the House of Representatives for the first time in 1986. After losing his seat in 1996, he was elected to the House of Councillors for the first time in 1998. Matsuda died from hypoglycemia on 3 February 2022, at the age of 84.

References

External links 
 Official website in Japanese.

1937 births
2022 deaths
Government ministers of Japan
Members of the House of Representatives (Japan)
Members of the House of Councillors (Japan)
University of Tokyo alumni
Alumni of the University of London
People from Gifu
Japan Renewal Party politicians
Liberal Democratic Party (Japan) politicians